West Indies women's cricket team toured South Africa in February 2016. The tour consisted of a series of 3 T20Is and 3 ODIs. The ODI series were part of the 2014–16 ICC Women's Championship. The West Indies won the ODI series by 2–1 and South Africa won the T20I series also by 2–1.

Squads

Tour match

ODI series

1st ODI

2nd ODI

3rd ODI

T20I series

1st T20I

2nd T20I

3rd T20I

References

External links 

International cricket competitions in 2015–16
2014–16 ICC Women's Championship
Women's international cricket tours of South Africa
2016 in South African cricket
2016 in women's cricket
2016 in South African women's sport
2016 in West Indian cricket
South Africa 2015–16